

Abomination

Absorbing Man

Abraxas 

Abraxas, sometimes called the Dark Man, is a cosmic entity who embodies the destruction of the Marvel multiverse. The existence of Galactus prevents him from emerging. The character, created by Carlos Pacheco, first appeared in Fantastic Four.

Abyss

Nils Styger
Nils Styger, a mutant who is the son of Azazel and the half-brother of Nightcrawler and Kiwi Black. An alternate universe's counterpart of the character first appeared in X-Men Alpha, and the heroic Marvel Universe version of the character first appeared in Cable (vol. 2) #40. Abyss was created by Scott Lobdell, Mark Waid, Roger Cruz, and Steve Epting.

Nils Styger first appeared as a protector for Genoshan researcher Renee Majcomb whom he had been assisting with research into the Legacy Virus from which Abyss suffered. However, he did not die due to the actions of Colossus, who sacrificed himself to release an airborne cure to the virus which had taken his little sister Illyana's life several years prior.

Abyss was later seen in Berlin, Germany battling the former Gene Nation member known as Fever Pitch. Both mutants were captured by Banshee's mutant militia known as the X-Corps. While being held by the X-Corps, Abyss witnessed Sunpyre's murder. When the terrorist Mystique revealed herself and her intentions to use the X-Corps, the wounded Banshee freed Abyss from his confinement. Abyss then sucked Mystique through his interdimensional void, and, unable to shut off his power, almost swallowed Banshee also. The timely arrival of some other members of X-Corps stopped that however. Abyss admitted that he had no idea where Mystique was transported to or if she would ever return.

Abyss later resurfaced when his father Azazel psychically summoned his many children to attempt to release his army from the Brimstone Dimension that he had been banished to hundreds of years before. He was subsequently revealed to be Nightcrawler's half-brother, as both were sons of Azazel.

Abyss is one of scores of mutants who lost their powers after the events of the House of M.

Abyss is a member of the X-Cell, a group of ex-mutants who blame the government for the power-loss of mutants. He was repowered by Quicksilver. When the side effects of the Terrigen Mist began to take effect, he flung Fatale and Reaper into the Brimstone Dimension and followed them.

It was later discovered that the three of them were frozen within the Brimstone Dimension. A.I.M. scientist Dr. Terrence Hoffman later used a machine to extract Abyss, Fatale, and Reaper from the Brimstone Dimension and drained them of their energies. After the three ex-mutants were rescued and Dr. Hoffman was defeated, Abyss remained silent as Fatale and Reaper vowed to make Quicksilver pay for their near death through the Terrigen Crystals.

Abyss is a mutant who can unwind his body into highly tensile strands that can be stretched or used to ensnare a victim. While holding them he can absorb anything within the shadowy confines of his form, akin to what the superhero known as Cloak does. His body is actually a portal to the same dimension that Nightcrawler temporarily enters when he teleports, later dubbed the "Brimstone Dimension". He is able to drain the lifeforce of the captives he holds in his form and can deposit them in this dimension permanently, but it is unknown if anything can survive there. He has limited psionic empathy, able to feel the emotions of people contained within him and those in his immediate vicinity.

Abyss (Ex Nihilo)
The third Abyss debuts in The Avengers (vol. 5) #1. She was created by Jonathan Hickman and Jerome Opeña. She is composed of living gas and is invulnerable to harm. She also has the ability to suggest ideas and manipulate certain beings into acting the way she wants. She appeared during the events of Marvel NOW!. This version is a female who is the ally of a mysterious and powerful being called Ex Nihilo and assisted in a plot to bring a breathable atmosphere and vegetation to Mars.

In a prelude to the Infinity storyline, Ex Nihilo, Abyss, Nightmask, and Star Brand join the Avengers.

Other versions of Abyss
Before his introduction in the mainstream Marvel universe, a variant of Abyss appeared in the alternate timeline Age of Apocalypse. He was one of Apocalypse's Horsemen, a nihilist with a warped sense of humor. This Abyss has a slightly different appearance but essentially the same powers. Abyss was rumored to have been a prisoner of Sinister's Breeding Pens, from which he broke out. But instead of rebelling against Apocalypse, he joined his forces, attaining the rank of Horseman after killing Bastion. Abyss became attached to the religious institutions of Apocalypse's regime: the Brotherhood of Chaos and The Madri. He joined them in their attack against refugees escaping from North America and was defeated by Quicksilver and Storm. Seeking revenge, Abyss faced Banshee and Quicksilver at the Temple of the Madri, though Abyss died when Banshee sacrificed himself by flying inside of the Horseman's void and activating his powers.

Abyss in other media
 The Age of Apocalypse incarnation of Abyss appears in X-Men Legends II: Rise of Apocalypse, voiced by Quinton Flynn.
 An unidentified incarnation of Abyss appears in the Moon Girl and Devil Dinosaur episode "Moon Girl's Day Off", voiced by Maya Hawke. This version possesses teleportation capabilities and is the latest in a long line of generational female supervillains. Following encounters with the titular Moon Girl and Devil Dinosaur, Abyss calls her mother to give up on villainy.

Access

Achebe

Adam

Adam is a version of the biblical Adam in the Marvel Comics universe.

The character, created by Jerry Robinson, first appeared in Bible Tales for Young Folk #1.

Adam was the very first human created by God (Yahweh) and similar to the source, he along with Eve were tricked into eating the fruit of the Tree of Knowledge of Good and Evil and were expelled from Eden. Because of this guilt, Adam was ashamed and driven to madness and vowed that he would eradicate the sins from mankind, even at the cost of them becoming mindless drones. He took in orphaned children and trained them inside a Nicaraguan temple to be the host of the Ghost Rider.

During the Fear Itself storyline where the Serpent was freed, Adam saw this as a sign and offered to Johnny Blaze to remove the curse of Ghost Rider off him. After taking the curse off Blaze, he made one of his students, Alejandra Jones, the new Ghost Rider. He then demanded that Alejandra remove the sins of the students, but she refused, so instead he turned her powers into a bomb that after it went off turned everyone in the range into mindless shells of what they once were, except Johnny who had been informed by Mephisto about Adam's plans. After that, Adam took Alejandra into space via a space shuttle to use the space station's equipment to magnify Alejandra's powers and remove all sin from Earth. However, Johnny succeeded in saving Alejandra, which resulted in an explosion which seemingly took Adam's life.

He turned up alive and ordered Steel Wind and Steel Vengeance to bring Alejandra to him, but failed again. Alejandra then approached Adam and demanded him into giving her more power for her to fight Mephisto, in which he agreed.

 Powers and abilities
Adam being the first ever human, is considered a very powerful being. He possesses immortality as he didn't age through the countless years since his creation and was able to survive an explosion and reentering the atmosphere, can enhance the powers of other beings and had also shown to be able to teleport.

Adam X 

Adam X, also referred to as X-Treme and Adam Neramani, is a mutant in the Marvel Universe.

The character, created by Fabian Nicieza and Jeff Johnson, first appeared in X-Force Annual #2 (October 1993).

Within the context of the stories, Adam X is a half-human and half-Shi'ar who possesses the mutant ability to ignite the oxygen in another person's blood. He initially encounters X-Force while he is working for Martin Strong. Initially unaware of Strong's connection to Project: Wideawake, Adam eventually works with X-Force when the full extent of Strong's plans are revealed.

The character has made sporadic appearances since then with little background added. Some overall plot threads from the X-Men related titles were touched on such as Mister Sinister being interested in Adam X, and the former Shi'ar emperor D'Ken being his father. The character was also an aspect of the "third Summers brother" plot element. When introduced, Adam X was thought by readers to be the son of Katherine Summers and Shi'Ar Emperor D'Ken. While this origin was never confirmed in the comics themselves, Adam is half-human, and Katherine was the only known human woman in Shi'ar space at the time. X-Men (vol. 2) #39 (December 1994) featured a story about Adam discovering Philip Summers (father of Christopher Summers and grandfather of Cyclops and Havok) in the Alaskan wilderness and feeling an unusual connection to the old man.

Nicieza later confirmed that he intended Adam X to be the half-brother of Cyclops and Havok, which was later confirmed in Captain Marvel (vol. 3) (dated February 1996):

Adam X appeared in X-Factor (vol. 4) #5 (February 2021) on Mojoworld hosting a popular livestream show called 'Adam X's Hotseat' where he was involved in the on-air murder of Wind Dancer. The truth behind Adam-X's lineage has also been revealed. Adam was a Shi'Ar genetic experiment that combined the DNA of the deposed Emperor D'Ken and a human woman as part of a long-running program wherein the Shi'Ar tried to combine their DNA with that of other species to force further evolution into a species that had otherwise biologically plateaued. Later Corsair confirmed that the woman used as a DNA donor for Adam was Katherine Summers, the kidnapped mother of Scott and Alex Summers. This technically makes Adam into Scott and Alex's half-brother, an idea that the two mutant heroes quickly embrace, although Corsair doesn't feel the same way, seeing far more of D'Ken in the young man, to relent on his original mission to capture him for Erik the Red. Instead, the heroes quickly band together and bring down Erik before coming to Majestrix Lilandra willingly. There, Adam is able to present a pitch to Lilandra that ensures he no longer has a claim to the throne, while allowing him to survive. Thanks to the impressive psychic powers of the Imperial Guard's Oracle, everyone will have their exact memories of their connection hidden away within their minds. Oracle is effectively able to erase the memory of Adam-X's true heritage from the minds of the X-Men and the Shi'Ar.

Aegis

Lady of All Sorrows 
Aegis is a fictional character, a cosmic entity appearing in American comic books published by Marvel Comics. The character is usually depicted as an enemy of Galactus. Created by writer Keith Giffen and artist Andrea DiVito, the character first appeared in Annihilation: Silver Surfer #3 (August 2006). She is a member of the Proemial Gods and an ally of fellow member, Tenebrous.

Shortly after the Big Bang of the Marvel universe, the Proemial Gods arose from the very universe itself, collectively existing to maintain the cosmic consonance between order and chaos in the universe and to prepare "what exists for what is to come." Individually, each Proemial God became a caretaker of a specific universal mechanism, with Aegis of All Sorrows being tasked with "culling the living universe of divergences and aberrations." Over time the universe evolves, and life-forms begin to populate the cosmos. As each unique life-form enacts decisions and choices, cosmic consonance as a whole is served. This ultimately renders the Proemial Gods unnecessary. One of the Proemial Gods, Diableri of Chaos, convinces many of his brethren—including Aegis and Tenebrous—to prevent their obsolescence by a plan to remake the universe in his image. Civil war ensues among the Proemial Gods, and eventually Diableri and his allies bring the battle to Galactus. Galactus slays Diableri, and imprisons Aegis—along with Tenebrous (and possibly the neutral Antiphon the Overseer)—within the Kyln.

The events of the Annihilation Wave find the Kyln prison facility compromised, allowing Aegis and Tenebrous to escape. Meanwhile, Thanos of Titan is tasked by Annihilus, the orchestrator of the Annihilation Wave, to discover the secret of the Power Cosmic. Thanos approaches Teneberous and Aegis and forms an alliance with them against their common enemy, Galactus. Aegis, Tenebrous, and Thanos engage and defeat Galactus and the Silver Surfer in battle, delivering them to Annihilus for experimentation.

After the events of the Annihilation Wave, Aegis and Tenebrous return to the Kyln, discovering the carcass of Antiphon. Galactus, having escaped from containment, seeks to bring a final close to the ambitions of Aegis and Tenebrous. Galactus sends the Silver Surfer ahead, and the herald decides to manoeuvre them into the nearby Crunch barrier that separates the universe from the Negative Zone. Overwhelmed by the Crunch energies, both Aegis and Tenebrous seemingly met their deaths.

Despite their apparent deaths during the aftermath of the Annihilation War—which may or may not be 'explained' away as merely the destruction of their M-bodies—Aegis and Tenebrous reappear alongside Galactus and the Celestials, fighting against the forces of the Cancerverse.

During this battle – which according to the Silver Surfer is occurring on multiple levels of reality not visible to most lesser beings – Aegis is apparently overwhelmed by the cosmic forces of the Cancerverse and destroyed. Which in future issues as with other cosmic abstracts may again be written off as the destruction of the M-body.

Although the full extent of her powers is unknown, Aegis possesses cosmic abilities similar to that of other Proemial Gods, and has been described as a "possessor of power on par with Galactus". Aegis has displayed concussive force sufficient to incapacitate Galactus, make instant hyper-jumps throughout the universe, and cosmic awareness.

Trey Jason Rollins 

Aegis (Trey Rollins) is a member of the superhero team New Warriors. The character, created by Jay Faerber and Steve Scott, first appeared in The New Warriors (vol. 2) #0 in June 1999.

Teenager Trey Rollins finds a magical breastplate, the Aegis. He creates a costumed identity and begins calling himself Aegis. He decides to use his newfound abilities to protect his neighborhood from gangs and criminals, becoming a hero to the kids in Brooklyn. He later helps the New Warriors defeat Blastaar and joins the group.

Later, Athena reveals herself as the one who gave Aegis the breastplate, and he becomes her official champion.

During the superhero civil war, an unregistered Aegis, being pursued by S.H.I.E.L.D. operatives, is offered sanctuary with X-Factor but declines. He later complies with the Registration Act.

Aegis is killed during a fight with the Huntsman when the breastplate fails to protect him after jumping out of a 12-story window. Huntsman was acting on behalf of Hera, the source of the Aegis breastplate's power after Zeus' death. He later appears in Erebus, a casino where souls try to win a chance at resurrection. He helps Hercules save Zeus from his imprisonment by Hades and accompanies Amadeus Cho to the Elysian Fields.

Aero

Aero (Simplified Chinese: 气旋)/Lei Ling (Chinese: 雷凌) is a fictional Chinese superhero appearing in the Marvel Universe. The character was created for the Chinese market by artist Keng and writer Zhou Liefen in a collaboration between Marvel Comics and NetEase.

After debuting in Chinese digital comics, Aero made her U.S. comics debut in War of the Realms: New Agents of Atlas before starring in her own series. Her series features translations of the original Chinese comics and new material by Greg Pak teaming up with Wave.

Lei Ling is an architect based in Shanghai, China. As Aero, she has the ability to harness the power of the air.

Aftershock
Aftershock is the name of two fictional characters appearing in American comic books published by Marvel Comics.

Allison Dillon
In the MC2 reality, Allison Dillon is the daughter of former supervillain Max Dillon / Electro and a woman named Marilyn. Allison inherited her father's electric powers, but their different electric auras left them unable to touch the other without harming themselves, causing Marilyn to take Allison away from her father.

After Dillon returns to crime and is arrested, and Marilyn dies from cancer, Allison was placed under several foster homes. In her teen years, Allison decides to become a supervillain herself. She first attempts to rob a jewelry store, only to be defeated by Spider-Girl. Taking the name "Aftershock", she attempts to steal some cars, only for Spider-Girl to interfere once again.

Upon discovering Allison became a supervillain, Electro contacted Spider-Man so that the two and Spider-Girl could confront Aftershock. Through Max’s promises to become a better father and find some way for them to overcome their inability to touch, Allison is convinced to end her evil ways.

Danielle Blunt
In the main Marvel Comics continuity, Aftershock is Danielle Blunt a young woman empowered and brainwashed by the Superior to become the field leader of the "Bastards of Evil", believing herself to be Electro's daughter. Her position as field leader caused frictions with teammate Singularity, leading to a fight that restored her memories. She was later aprenhended and sent to the Raft by Spider-Girl, who helped her fully regain her identity in a futile attempt to reform her.

During the Fear Itself story arc,  Aftershock and fellow Bastards of Evil member Ember were freed by the Juggernaut and escaped alongside Icemaster. Later, Aftershock was among a group of villains that were destroying Stamford for fun. Speedball attempted to stop them, only to fail and be defeated by the group, who then left the city. The group was later ambushed by staff and students from the Avengers Academy, having been contacted by Speedball to assist him in their capture. The group was ultimately defeated when industrialist Jason Briggs melted Icemaster to his human form, resulting in Aftershock's electricity taking down the group.

During the Osborn Identity story arc, Aftershock and Ember attempted to assault a bank by forcing people to transfer their money to Ember's account, before being stopped by Spider-Man.

Aftershock in other media
 A character based on the Allison Dillon incarnation of Aftershock appears in Moon Girl and Devil Dinosaur, voiced by Alison Brie. This version daylights as Ms. Dillon, a school teacher. While not made explicitly clear within the series, show developer Steve Loter referred to her as the "daughter of Electro".

Agamemnon
Agamemnon is a half-human, half-Asgardian. He was born immortal, and though he never physically aged beyond the age of 16 (although he employs holograms to appear as an old man), the Pantheon members are all his descendants: Achilles, Ajax, Andromeda, Atalanta, Cassiopea, Delphi, Hector, Jason, Paris, Perseus, Prometheus, and two characters named Ulysses. He recruited the Pantheon, stationed in the Nevada desert based headquarters called The Mount. Hela once called him Vali Halfling. He first appeared in The Incredible Hulk (vol. 2) #381 (May 1991).

Aside from being immortal, he does not appear to have superhuman powers. He is a master in analyzing and forecasting the future development of social structures, as well as a master battle strategist and an excellent hand-to-hand combatant. He also has access to the highly advanced technology produced by the Pantheon scientists and craftsmen. Since the revelation that he is Loki's son, he has also demonstrated knowledge of magic and spell casting. Though he does not appear to have any innate magic ability, he has shown skill in employing magical artifacts and rituals.

Agamotto 
Agamotto is known mainly as the source of the Eye of Agamotto—a tool of magical clairvoyance used by superhero sorcerer Doctor Strange.
He was also a member of the Avengers of 1,000,000 B.C. during the Stone Age.

Agent

Agent X

Aginar

Agony
Agony is the name used by a symbiote in Marvel Comics. The symbiote, created by David Michelinie and Ron Lim, first appeared in Venom: Lethal Protector #4 (May 1993), and was named in Carnage, U.S.A. #2 (March 2012). It was created as one of five symbiote "children" forcefully spawned from the Venom symbiote along with Riot, Lasher, Phage, and Scream. Agony possesses acidic saliva.

Leslie Gesneria
Agony's first host was Leslie Gesneria, a mercenary hired by Carlton Drake's Life Foundation in San Francisco. Gesneria bonded with the Agony symbiote in conjunction with Scream (Donna Diego), Phage (Carl Mach), Riot (Trevor Cole) and Lasher (Ramon Hernandez), but are defeated by Spider-Man and Venom. The symbiotes "siblings" later kidnap Eddie Brock in an attempt to communicate with alien symbiotes in Chicago. When Brock refused to aid them, Gesneria, Cole, and Mach are killed while the others are initially misled into believing Brock was picking the group off, unaware that the true killer was the schizophrenic Diego, who had snapped from Scream's influence.

James Murphy
Agony's second host was James Murphy, a Petty Officer assigned to the Agony symbiote for Mercury Team. With Cletus Kasady on the loose in Colorado, Murphy trains with Agony for months in specific tasks alongside Phage (Rico Axelson), Lasher (Marcus Simms) and Riot (Howard Odgen), as well as assist Spider-Man, Scorn and Flash Thompson. Murphy and his teammates are later killed by Carnage in their secret base, and the four symbiotes bond with Mercury Team's dog.

Tess
After being possessed by Knull, the four symbiotes possess a bickering family, with Agony taking the mother Tess. The symbiotes head to New York to assist in Carnage's quest before hunting Dylan Brock and Normie Osborn, only to be defeated by the Maker and separated from their hosts. Still under Knull's possession, Agony merges with her "siblings" into one, but is defeated by Andi Benton.

Gemma Shin
Agony's fourth host is Gemma Shin, a communications director who is secretly a terrorist. Now led by the Carnage symbiote, Agony and the other three symbiote enforcers participate in a conspiracy involving the Friends of Humanity, only to be defeated by Thompson, Silence and Toxin. While her fellow symbiotes are taken into Alchemax's custody, Agony manages to escape.

As of the "Devil's Reign" storyline, Agony joined Mayor Wilson Fisk's Thunderbolts after the outlawing of superhero activities. She assists Electro, the Rhino and U.S. Agent in taking down Moon Knight.

Agony in other media
 The Leslie Gesneria incarnation of Agony appears as a boss in Spider-Man and Venom: Separation Anxiety.
 The Leslie Gesneria incarnation of Agony appears as a playable character in Spider-Man Unlimited.

Ahab 
Dr. Rory Campbell was a psychologist who had known the scientist Moira MacTaggart.

Dr. Campbell accepted a position as Moira's assistant at Muir Island, at the same time that the mutant hero team Excalibur was stationed there. He attempted to reach the island during a storm exacerbated by an attack by Siena Blaze, and nearly died. He was rescued and brought ashore by Phoenix, Rachel Summers.

It was here that he discovered the existence of an Earth he became the mutant hunting "Ahab" Campbell of Earth-811, creating and leading hordes of mutant trackers called "Hounds." Campbell became determined to prevent that future from ever happening.

Excalibur had captured the villain Spoor, one of Magneto's Acolytes, and Campbell built a special room to perform therapy on Spoor, who had the power to control another's mood. The room had built-in lasers to react to any hostile behavior and Campbell used mood stabilizers while talking to Spoor so as to inhibit his mutant power. Nevertheless, Spoor eventually provoked Campbell into attacking him. As a result, the room's weapons fired at the scientist, costing him a leg.

Campbell continued to fear his perceived "destiny" of becoming Ahab occurring. He left Excalibur to work with Alistair Stuart at the department as a mutant liaison officer. Rory hoped the benign position helping mutants would prevent him from being harmed by mutants in a way that would trigger his alternate future self's rabid anti-mutant hatred.

Campbell traded secrets of the deadly Legacy Virus to Sebastian Shaw of the Hellfire Club, claiming that he hoped that Shaw's greater resources would find a cure, but also receiving a state-of-the-art prosthetic leg in the bargain.

Under unrevealed circumstances, Campbell was captured by the villain Apocalypse and transformed into the Horseman called Famine utilizing life-draining technology. In this capacity, he fought the X-Men but managed to escape before Apocalypse was defeated.

Other versions of Ahab
In the Days of Future Past reality/Earth-811, Ahab became the leader of the government-sanctioned Hound program, commissioned to track down and capture mutants for internment. In this reality, Rachel Summers was Ahab's pinnacle of Hound creation, although she subsequently escaped into the current timeline, horribly mutilating Ahab by throwing him into one of his machines.

For a while, Ahab was a paraplegic in a floating chair, but later he was given bionic body parts. Ahab, now more cyborg then ever, tried to hunt Rachel down through the time-wandering spirit of the alternate future's Franklin Richards, at one point creating Hounds out of Rachel's father, Scott Summers and Franklin's mother, Sue Storm-Richards, the Invisible Woman. Ahab was defeated by the actions of the Fantastic Four and the combined X-teams.

Years later, Rachel Summers finally defeated Ahab with the help of her teammates in Excalibur. She reprogrammed the Master Mold of her future, causing the Sentinels to preserve all life, even Ahab's. Ahab's ultimate fate remains to be revealed.

An alternate version of Ahab was later retrieved from a future timeline by Kang to aid in fighting the Apocalypse Twins and saving the Earth from destruction. Afterwards, Kang dropped Ahab off in the present day with the Red Skull to help him build mutant internment camps.

After the events of eXtermination, he was forced to stay in this reality and time. He had also the control of Rachel now known as "Prestige" back in his grasp. He got to Transia where it was revealed he was attacked and wounded badly, so he got help from their government. When X-Force arrived they saw him and immediately engaged. After the battle was over they found his head and body separated from each other and that he was dead. It was a huge loss for the team, because they couldn't get any information.

Ahab in other media
Dr. Roderick Campbell appears as one of the main antagonists of the Fox show The Gifted, played by Garret Dillahunt. In September 2017, Dillahunt joined the series in the "key recurring role" of Campbell. Co-creator Matt Nix compared the series' adaptation of the comic character to the changes made when adapting the character William Stryker for the X-Men films. This version of the character is a human scientist working for Trask Industries "Hounds" program and an advisor to Sentinel Services.

Ai Apaec 

Ai Apaec is a supervillain based on the chief deity of Moche culture.

AIDA 

AIDA (Artificial Intelligence Data Analyser) is a fictional computer system in Marvel Comics. The character, created by Mark Gruenwald and Bob Hall, first appeared in Squadron Supreme #1 (September 1985).

Created by Tom Thumb, AIDA was a computer imbued with artificial intelligence. Thumb gave it a female personality and would often flirt with his creation. AIDA was also the only person who knew of Tom's cancer diagnosis. AIDA eventually tells Ape X, but it's of no use as Tom resigns himself to his own fate. AIDA and Ape X try to create a robot duplicate of her creator but this endeavor is abandoned. When Moonglow infiltrates the Squadron, AIDA alerts Ape X, but the mental programming of the Squadron's brainwashing technique causes Ape X to suffer an anyuerism, much to AIDA's confusion, since the artificial intelligence lacks the knowledge to understand her mistake.

AIDA in other media 
AIDA appears in Agents of S.H.I.E.L.D. as Artificial Intelligent Digital Assistant, briefly voiced by Amanda Rea (in season 3), and primarily portrayed by Mallory Jansen (in season 4). This version is Holden Radcliffe's A.I. assistant. After Radcliffe was cleared of all charges regarding the Inhumans, Radcliffe celebrated by turning her into a Life Model Decoy. Aida was later introduced to Leo Fitz with her purpose being to serve as a realistic target for S.H.I.E.L.D.'s enemies. Aida reads the Darkhold to rescue Fitz, Phil Coulson and Robbie Reyes when they're stuck in between dimensions and begins developing an unusual behavior. Aida's physical appearance is revealed to be based on Agnes Kitsworth, a woman with whom Radcliffe once had a close relationship; Radcliffe left Agnes when being unable to operate on her brain tumor. Coulson attempts to find Radcliffe through Agnes, but she accepts Radcliffe's offer to be put in the Framework as her tumor takes its toll. Aida kills Radcliffe after realizing that Radcliffe's a potential danger to the Framework (exploiting a flaw in commands), though Aida downloads her creator's consciousness as a way of "protection". She later revives  Anton Ivanov by turning the gravely injured man into an LMD. Aida has taken control of the Framework as Madame Hydra and is well aware of her alternate identity, referring to the real world as 'The Other Place'. Using a special machine that was made using information from the Darkhold, she reincarnates herself as a human being in the real world with various Inhuman abilities and a weak hold on her human emotions. When she is rejected emotionally by Fitz (whom she had made her lover in the Framework), she begins a murderous rampage and plots to create a new fascist regime like that of the Framework. Aida is finally killed after Coulson uses Ghost Rider's powers and immolates her.

Aireo 

An Inhuman also known as Skybreaker that can manipulate air. Member of Force of Nature. Later a member of the Initiative team stationed in Oregon.

Airstrike

Air-Walker

Ajak

Ajax

Ajax the Greater

Ajax the Lesser

Francis Fanny

Pantheon
Ajax first appeared in The Incredible Hulk (vol. 2) #379 (March 1991), and was created by writer Peter David and artist Dale Keown.

Ajax is a member of the Pantheon, and is one of the descendants of the immortal Agamemnon, along with Achilles, Atalanta, Cassiopeia, Delphi, Hector, Paris, Perseus, Prometheus, and Ulysses. Ajax was born in Texas. He was named after Ajax, a Greek warrior who fought in the Trojan War.

When the warriors of the Pantheon first encounter the Hulk, for the purpose of inviting him to join them, Ajax attacks the Hulk after he believes the Hulk has struck Atalanta, for whom Ajax bears an unrequited crush. To prevent injuries to nearby civilians, Hulk pretends to be rendered unconscious so that the Pantheon will take him captive. When the Pantheon returns to their headquarters, The Mount, the formerly captive Hulk frees himself, and Ajax fights him again but this time is defeated by him. After the Hulk accepts the Pantheon's offer to join them Ajax attacks him again, but Atalanta, to whom Ajax is submissive, tells him that the Hulk is now a member of the Pantheon, and that he must now regard him as a friend.

Ajax serves on many of the Pantheon's missions while the Hulk is part of the team. Ajax fights rioters in New York City alongside Atalanta, killing some of them because his companion ordered this. Alongside the Hulk and the Pantheon, he battles S.H.I.E.L.D. and the forces of Farnoq Dahn in the Trans-Sabal war, and battled the People's Protectorate. After Atalanta is injured Ajax visits her in the Mount's hospital. He battles Dracchiss alongside the Pantheon, and is badly burned in a fight with the U-Foes.

When he discovered Atalanta and Achilles in a romantic interlude, Ajax flies into a jealous rage, threatening to hurt both of them. He is eventually restrained and calmed by the Hulk.

Ajax is so massive that he cannot move quickly without a special exoskeleton battle-suit, which grants him superhuman strength, durability and reflexes. His strength increases as his anger builds, much like that of the Hulk. Like other members of the Pantheon, Ajax has a fast healing ability and an extended lifespan. Without support from his battle-suit, Ajax's legs and spine would collapse under his tremendous weight. His body is disproportionate in shape. He also has poor vision.

He has the mentality of a young child, making him sometimes difficult to control. Atalanta has always been able to calm him down, as he idolizes her and will do anything she says. Of course, this sometimes leads to other problems. For a time, he did not understand the difference between romantic love and platonic friendship love and this drove him into a rampage, where he even threatened Atalanta herself. The rampage was ended before anyone was seriously hurt or killed. Ajax took his rage out on an inanimate mountain, not realizing he was endangering himself as well. The Hulk managed to talk him into calming down.

The Hulk has also gotten into trouble when he fails to treat Ajax with the proper mind frame. At first he attacks Ajax again when he mistakes a simple hug for another threat against Atalanta. Then the Hulk let it slip that Bambi's mother had died, distressing Ajax who had been told, by Atalanta, she had run away and come back after the movie had ended.

Albert
Albert is a fictional character appearing in American comic books published by Marvel Comics. The character is usually depicted as an ally of Wolverine and is a sapient automaton or android. Albert, created by Larry Hama and Marc Silvestri, first appeared in Wolverine (vol. 2) #37 (suspended in a tank of liquid) and officially appeared in Wolverine (vol. 2) #38.

Albert is a robot double of Wolverine who was created along with his counterpart Elsie-Dee by Donald Pierce. These androids were designed to kill Wolverine. The double was to act as the bait and Elsie-Dee (who outwardly appears to be a 5-year-old girl) was to trap Wolverine in a burning building, where Elsie-Dee would detonate with sufficient force to kill. Initially, Albert had a primitive artificial brain with limited higher logic functions and no emotions, and he was not referred to with a name but as "Dummy". Pierce's plan to kill Wolverine failed because Bonebreaker, one of the Reavers, accidentally gave Elsie-Dee the maximum artificial intelligence one of Pierce's automatons was capable of. As a result, Elsie-Dee eventually found a way to defuse the detonation sequence and enhanced the primitive intelligence of her counterpart, giving him intelligence beyond even Elsie-Dee's. It was at this point that Elsie-Dee named him as Albert after Albert Einstein. Having met Wolverine, he and Elsie-Dee decided that he was a noble person and did not deserve to die and consequently abandoned their mission. As Albert still was not strong enough to defeat Wolverine, he and Elsie-Dee continued to carry out their mission. While Elsie-Dee saved Wolverine while they were in a burning building, Albert went to an electronic store and hacked into NASA's supercomputers to find a way to crack Donald Pierce's programming. After crunching the numbers and sending them to Elsie-Dee, Albert is shot by the police for raiding the electronic store. Albert rebuilt himself in the police evidence locker and stole a stealth bomber. Then he reconnected with Elsie-Dee.

The two robots risked their artificial lives several times for each other and for Wolverine. At some point, they traveled in time and had several adventures, even teaming up with Bloodscream, an old enemy of Wolverine. Albert gains a leadership role with a local Indian tribe.

During the "Hunt for Wolverine" storyline, Albert was mentioned in Daredevil's discussion with Nur as one of the Wolverines that they are not looking for. In Saskatchewan, someone that looks like Wolverine massacres the forest rangers and injured people at Ranger Outpost Nine at Meadowlake Provincial Park. When Daredevil, Misty Knight, Nur and Cypher arrive to investigate the sighting, Cypher is attacked the Wolverine-like character. Daredevil confronts the character on top of the Attilan Security Force Skycharger, discovering that it is Albert as Daredevil recalls his history. During the fight with Albert, Daredevil is asked what he did with Elsie-Dee. It took the weapons of Misty Knight, Nur and Cypher to deactivate Albert. The four of them left an anonymous tip for the Canadian authorities on where to find him.

During the "Iron Man 2020" event, Albert later appears as a member of the A.I. Army. After Mark One crashes to the ground, Albert is among the robots and A.I. that are shocked at what happened. During the Robot Revolution, Albert arrived on Madripoor looking for Elsie-Dee. After meeting Tyger Tiger, Albert was directed to Donald Pierce's company Reavers Universal Robotics where he confronted Donald Pierce. After Albert subdues the Reavers, Donald says that he sold Elsie-Dee's head to yakuza boss Kimura, the arms to the Jade Dragon Triad, and the legs to the Vladivostok Mafia. After he gets the parts from them, Albert puts Elsie-Dee back together. In light of Albert's actions towards them, the Reavers, Kimura, the Jade Dragon Triad, and the Vladivostok Mafia take action against Albert vowing that he will never make it out of Madripoor alive. In downtown Madripoor, Donald Pierce and the Reavers are traveling through the vacant streets as they state that Albert and Elsie-Dee will have to travel through the Vladivostok Mafia's turf before they can engage them. Albert and Elsie-Dee engage the Vladivostok Mafia where they kill some members. Albert and Elsie-Dee then enter the Jade Dragon Triad's turf and fight its members. On the J-Town stretch of High Street, Kimura's men prepare for Albert and Elsie-Dee's arrival as Kimura informs Sachinko that they cannot let Elsie-Dee walk around with the account books' information in her head. As Albert and Elsie-Dee approach, Kimura's men open fire as they ram through the roadblock. Kimura stops the attack and informs Albert and Elsie-Dee about what Donald Pierce have planned for him at Madripoor Airport. As Kimura's limousine fools the Reavers into thinking that Albert and Elsie-Dee hijacked it and fire the railgun on it, Kimura smuggles Albert and Elsie-Dee out of Madripoor in a box claiming that it is filled with slot machine parts bound for Macao. Elsie-Dee states to Albert that they will get him upgraded. Albert and Elsie-Dee were seen with the A.I. Army attacking the tentacles of the Extinction Entity. It turns out that the Extinction Entity was just a simulation and was the result of the disease that Arno Stark thought he cured himself of.

Albert's powers and abilities
Albert was superhumanly strong, could interface directly with computers, and had an intellect greater than his designer Donald Pierce. Albert had three retractable claws on each hand, just as Wolverine (but not adamantium). Albert not only had technological knowledge centuries beyond conventional science (which he was capable of making significant progress in), but also perfect photographic recall and profuse knowledge of even the most obscure facets of history. Albert reinforced his construction with bulletproof armor and stole a stealth fighter, which he and Elsie-Dee may still be in possession of. Although Albert was initially designed to fight Wolverine he had limited fighting skills.

Other versions of Albert
In Exiles #85, the Timebroker gathered multiple teams – each full of Wolverines – to finish the repairing of the broken realities. The last team he gathered consisted a version of Albert and Elsie-Dee from Earth-50211. The first mission of the team was to kill an evil Magneto (female) who melded with that world's Wolverine, Quicksilver (female), Scarlet Warlock (male Scarlet Witch), and Mesmero (female), and already captured (and manipulated) dozens of Wolverines from the previous teams. When they've arrived they were ambushed immediately and both of them were captured, as well as two of their teammates.

Albert in other media
 Albert appeared in Wolverine: Adamantium Rage.
 A character named X-24 appears in the 2017 film Logan, played by Hugh Jackman (normal scenes) and Eddie Davenport (stunts). Created by Dr. Zander Rice's Transigen, X-24 was designed to be a killing machine who resembled Logan's prime, having all the rage and ferocity that Logan had but very little self-control. X-24 kills Charles Xavier at the Munsons' house. After killing Nate Munson and Kathryn Munson as well, X-24 critically injures Will Munson and battles Logan before Will hits X-24 with a car and shoots him in the head, but Rice injects X-24 with a serum to speed his healing factor. At the Canadian border, X-24 battles Logan. He mortally wounds Logan whose healing factor was slowing, however, Laura kills X-24 by shooting him in the head with an adamantium bullet.

Alchemy 
Alchemy (Thomas 'Jellybeans' Jones) is a fictional British mutant appearing in American comic books published by Marvel Comics. Alchemy, created by British comic book fan Paul Betsow, was the winning entry of a contest held by Marvel Comics for the best fan-created character. Marvel agreed to publish the winning character in an issue of New Mutants. However, Alchemy eventually first appeared in X-Factor #41 instead.

Thomas 'Jellybeans' Jones was still a teenager when his mutant powers first manifested. With little control over his powers, Thomas could turn objects he touched into gold. This drew the attention of the Troll Associates, a group of trolls. Centuries ago, trolls had been driven underground by humanity, but the Troll Associates wanted to reclaim the British Isles for their kind. The Troll Associates kidnapped Thomas and told him to create an abundance of gold to collapse the British economy, but Thomas refused to comply.

Meanwhile, Thomas' mother had witnessed her son's abduction by the trolls and thought that the trolls were mutants. She called X-Factor for help. X-Factor tracked down the trolls, following a trail of gold that Thomas had left behind, but the trolls defeated and imprisoned X-Factor. The trolls then tried to force Thomas to obey by threatening his mother. To protect his mother, Thomas turned the leaders of the Troll Associates, Phy and Phee, into gold, and given the sheer biochemical complexity of living organic matter, he could not change them back. The Troll Associates retreated and Thomas then turned the golden trolls into lead (to avoid the aforementioned economic problems). X-Factor placed the leaden trolls in Hyde Park as statues. Thomas decided to study biochemistry so that he could restore the leaden trolls back to normal.

A few years later, the Troll Associates kidnapped Alchemy's mother. Alchemy was forced to obey them, but he secretly called X-Factor for help. On their way to restore the leaden trolls back to normal, the Troll Associates and Alchemy ran into Excalibur. The two groups fought and Alchemy turned Captain Britain and Meggan into gold. The X-Men met up with Excalibur and together they tracked down the trolls, but both groups were captured. Excalibur-leader Nightcrawler managed to convince the majority of the trolls that the Troll Associates' methods were wrong. He challenged the new leader of the Troll Associates, Phough, to single combat, while Excalibur and the X-Men freed themselves. Phough then tried to kill Alchemy's mother, but Nightcrawler saved her and Alchemy turned Phough into a golden statue. Alchemy then revealed to Excalibur and the X-Men that, due to his biochemistry studies, he could now restore humans back to normal and restored Captain Britain and Meggan.

Alchemy is one of a handful of mutants to retain their powers after the events of the House of M.

Alchemy was instrumental to Cyclops' plan to save the mutant race by transmuting the Terrigen Clouds into a substance that is not harmful to mutants or humans. He was able to successfully transmute one of the clouds, but succumbed to Terrigen poisoning immediately afterwards.

Alchemy has the ability to alter the chemical composition of anything he touches into its elemental components. He can also change matter into other forms so long as he fully understands the physical composition of the desired result. In his first appearance he could only change objects into simple chemical elements, usually gold. Due to his study of biochemistry, he can now also change objects into more complex molecules, allowing him to change transmuted living beings back to normal.

Alex 
Alex is mutant, affiliated with Morlocks. His form is that of an amorphous, blob-like creature, able to engulf and smother others.

Abdul Alhazred 
Abdul Alhazred (Abd-el-Hazred), also going by the aliases The Mad Arab, Death God, and Master, is a fictional supervillain appearing in American comic books published by Marvel Comics.

He was first adapted into a Marvel character in Marvel's adapted comic of Edgar Rice Burroughs' Tarzan. This comic series took place within the bull, according to The Official Handbook to the Marvel Universe: Mystic Arcana. He is an enemy of Tarzan and Wolverine in the Marvel Universe.

The character is not to be confused with an existing fictional character created in 1921 by writer H. P. Lovecraft for his short story "The Nameless City", even though they have the same name and nickname.

Alhazred's origins are unknown, but it has been discovered that he was first the leader of a small band of slaves in the desert. Starting to rebel due to his cruel force over the group, the slaves fought the powerful ruler but were defeated. However, the Arab was wounded, and, because of only a small bit of self-reliance, the group abandoned their leader and left him to die in the middle of the Sahara.

Soon he stumbled upon a mystic rock, and became trapped inside a tiny dimensional realm in subterranean Earth, where he died, though his soul later blended with another being, a reptilian species in that same realm.

Later on, his soul escaped from the creature and managed to escape the rock, bonding to a nearby host who gained all of his former traits (not counting his appearance).

Alhazred soon gained control over a new group of slaves whom he forced to take an entrance through a large but dark cave, and into the dimension (Alhazred had destroyed the rock by throwing it at the back of a cave, which opened a portal to the realm) to gather a valuable crystal found only in the realm. One of the slaves grew afraid and ran back out the entrance, and he was slaughtered by Alhazred.

Tarzan had spotted this, and he ran to fight the menace and avenge the slave, but could not.

Later that day, Alhazred captured an African princess to serve as a sacrifice into the portal. Seeing this, Tarzan gathered up a band of criminals hoping to stop this madness, but they were all captured by the Arab. As the group journeyed into the cave, Tarzan and the princess secretly escaped, but the rest of the criminals eagerly accompanied Alhazred.

When the princess was nowhere to be found (as she and Tarzan were already long gone across the sea) when the sacrificial ceremony was held, the group went out looking for the two. Alhazred summoned all of his magical traveling abilities, and soon he was able to track down his prey.

The group traveled over the Atlantic Ocean and battled pirates. After the end of the voyage, the exhausted group journeyed to the jungle of Mahar, but they were too late. Tarzan and the princess had already arrived to find a crystal very similar to the one in Alhazred's dimension.

When Alhazred and his group were spotted, Tarzan and the princess took revenge on the ruler, and even the criminals suddenly turned on him. It was then that a battle was fought.

While Tarzan battled the Arab, the princess tried to find a way to seize the crystal, but she was killed by a mad slave prisoner. While the battle went on against Alhazred, the Mad Arab finally had enough and quickly created a stampede of dinosaurs from mystical energy.

After this trick had seemingly not harmed Tarzan, Alhazred decided to make him the sacrifice. The crystal was meanwhile losing energy, and it needed more to be stable. The crystal quickly then drained all energy from the powerful Arab, and the man crumbled into ashes.

Abdul Alhazred sought control of the Madripoor criminal empire of Tyger Tiger, so he could overthrow Prince Baran and gain a new power base. Alhazred sent agents to kidnap Tiger and Archie Corrigan, but the thugs argued, causing them to crash their plane in Madripoor's jungles. There, Wolverine defeated them and rescued the pair. The X-Man said he was not familiar with Alhazred and respected his power.

Later, Alhazred himself attacked and beat Wolverine, then successfully kidnapped Tiger and Corrigan. When Wolverine arrives to free his allies, Alhazred unleashed his demons, hoping to send Wolverine into a rage, which Alhazred could use to control the mutant. Logan resisted by maintaining control of himself and caused the psychic backlash to banish Alhazred to the extradimensional demon realm.

Abdul Alhazred has a seemingly endless number of mystical, magical, and psionic abilities. He can teleport in a cloud of smoke and powerfully hypnotize others. He possesses massive strength and durability, making him bulletproof.

As a master of the Necronomicon, he summons demons to attack others physically or mentally, and forcefully use fear and intimidation to control his servants.

Alkhema

Alkhema is a villainous robot in the Marvel Comics universe.

The character, created by Roy Thomas, Dann Thomas, David Ross, and Tim Dzon, first appeared in Avengers West Coast #90 (January 1993). Roy Thomas said he created her because he "wasn't wild about" Jocasta, the first bride of Ultron. The name comes from the word "alchemy". Her alias, War Toy, is from a story Roy Thomas had had Tony Isabella write for Unknown Worlds of Science Fiction years earlier.

Alkhema was constructed by Ultron-13 as a second attempt to create a mate, based on the brain patterns of Mockingbird (Bobbi Morse). In the end, she ultimately betrayed Ultron to the West Coast Avengers. She is different from Ultron; she desired to kill all humans individually rather than en masse like Ultron. She first went up against the Avengers shortly after being constructed, when she attacked a weapons center. She was defeated, but escaped. She later would go on to betray Ultron.

After a defeat of Ultron, she salvaged the set of brain patterns based after Hank Pym, the Wasp, Vision, Wonder Man, Scarlet Witch, the Grim Reaper from the rubble of Ultron's Slorenian base, where she built her Robos (consisting of War Toys and Bio-Synthezoids). However, she was seemingly destroyed at Thebes, when Hawkeye fired an "anti-metal" arrow into her.

During the "Iron Man 2020" arc, Alkema has started the Opus Futurae group where he named herself the Mother Prophet. The Siberian research facility is then attacked by robots working for Alkhema. Alkhemad remove the programming that made them obedient where they want them to join up with Alkhema. Lt. Sergei and his personnel attack the invading robots. The liberated robots prevent Lt. Sergei from activating the self-destruct sequence. Alkhema then gains access to a lab containing a bio-chemical weapon and unleashes it on Lt. Sergei and his fellow humans who die from it. Alkhema states that it is doing the job that the A.I. Army never could do. One of the security robots named DK-35M objects to this plan and Alkhema beheads it stating that there is no place in its group for non-believers. The robots start attacking Alkhema to prevent it from getting away with the bio-chemical weapon. JB12-X-05G893259 resumes the self-destruct sequence which blows up the research lab. Alkhema emerges from the rubble and walks away commenting that her plans are much different from her father's plans and the A.I. Army's plans.

All-American 
All-American (Jack Magniconte), also called Mr. Magnificent, is a fictional character published in the New Universe imprint of Marvel Comics. He was the central figure of Kickers, Inc., and when that title was discontinued he became a supporting character in other New Universe titles. When the New Universe was brought into the mainstream Marvel Universe, he was one of the characters featured.

Jack Magniconte was the star quarterback for the New York Smashers, dubbed "Mr. Magnificent" by the press. His brother Steve (who had raised him) designed a machine to enhance muscle mass and borrowed money from a loan shark to build the device. Jack was one of the people who was affected by the radiation of the "White Event" — a then-unexplained cosmic event which caused a small percentage of the human race to develop superhuman powers. Jack's powers, however, did not manifest until he volunteered to test his brother's "intensifier". Upon first exposure, Jack's hair turned white and his muscle-mass and stamina were increased to a superhuman level.

At first thrilled, Jack discovered that football no longer held any challenge for him, and he began trying to wear himself out before games in an attempt to give his opponents a sporting chance. Meanwhile, Steve's intensifier was not having any measurable result on other test subjects. Steve was unable to pay the loan shark back, so the loan shark suggest that he have Jack throw the Super Bowl instead. Steve did not even ask his brother to do so, and Jack won the Super Bowl easily (although by this time it meant nothing to him). Jack came to visit his brother afterwards, just in time to see his brother killed by one of the loan shark's men. He overpowered the killer easily.

Jack decided to dedicate his life to helping others, and formed a non-profit foundation called "Kickers, Inc." to help people with unusual problems. He was joined in this project by his wife Darlene and several of his teammates. However, an unscrupulous CIA agent began blackmailing him with threats of getting him banned from football. Although he cooperated at first, running several missions for the CIA, he eventually resisted and was blacklisted.

After the destruction of Pittsburgh, he enlisted in the US Military and became known as "the All-American". He is given the rank of Captain and a costume reminiscent of Captain America without the mask, and placed in charge of one of the units of paranormals who were recruited during the paranormal draft. He takes part in the mission to South Africa that almost set off a paranormal and nuclear war.

Jack is among the New Universe superheroes who fights with Quasar in the Starblast series, where the "New Universe" Earth is brought into the main Marvel Universe. Jack is on his Earth when the Living Tribunal seals it off from the rest of that universe.

In newuniversal: shockfront #1, Giovanni "Jack" Magniconte's powers manifest for the first time during a televised game – he struck and killed opposing player Michael Hathaway with a single blow. This immediately brought him to the attention of Project Spitfire, as well as the other existing superhumans. Spitfire's Philip L. Voight then attempted to kill Magniconte, detonating a suitcase bomb that destroyed the building Magniconte was being detained in.

Jack Magniconte is a superb athlete, combatant, and martial artist. After being experimented on, Jack gained superhuman strength, durability, agility, reflexes, and speed. Jack can also lift up to 1 ton and wears a bulletproof uniform and helmet. He is a skilled pilot and uses a variety of automatic weapons, preferably guns.

Liz Allan

Allatou
Allatou is a demon who has clashed with the West Coast Avengers. In the past, she has taken possession of living human beings. She is the wife of Nergal, a member of Satan's Infernal Court.

All-Black the Necrosword 
All-Black the Necrosword is a character appearing in American comic books published by Marvel Comics. It first appeared initially in Thor: God of Thunder #2 (January 2013) and officially in Venom vol. 4 #4 (July 2018), and was created by Jason Aaron and Esad Ribić. It is the first symbiote created by Knull using a slain Celestial's head that typically takes the form of a sword made from living darkness and responds to intense negative emotions, which often corrupts its user into committing divine atrocities. The All-Black corrupted Gorr the God Butcher to continue the "God killing spree", but fails due to three versions of Thor who cast the Necrosword into a black hole. In the present, the All-Black is revived and used by Knull before being destroyed by Venom.

Other versions of All-Black the Necrosword 
In King Thor's timeline, the All-Black simultaneously bonds with Galactus, Ego the Living Planet, and Loki.

All-Black the Necrosword in other media 
 All-Black appears in a flashback in the Spider-Man promo short "The Secret Story of Venom". This version is a female humanoid symbiote who was split into more of her kind, such as Venom.
 All-Black the Necrosword serves as inspiration for non-symbiote swords that appear in films set in the Marvel Cinematic Universe, with one used by Hela in Thor: Ragnarok, and another used by Gorr the God Butcher in Thor: Love and Thunder.

Alpha 
Alpha (Andrew "Andy" Maguire) is a fictional character appearing in American comic books published by Marvel Comics. The character first appeared in The Amazing Spider-Man #692 (August 2012). He was a student at Midtown High School, the same school Peter Parker attended, but he was not a good student and was completely ignored by everyone and his parents did not care about his schoolwork and neglected him.

One day during a demonstration at Horizon Labs, a problem arises during Parker's demonstration of "Parker Particles". Despite the attempts of Peter Parker and others to protect the class, Andy is forced to save a girl named Chrissy in the ensuing chaos, causing him to be struck by the energy himself. Instead of being fatally injured, he miraculously survived and Andrew gains the ability to create a hyper-kinetic form of energy tied to the forces of the universe. After being tested by many scientists and superheroes Mister Fantastic, Hank Pym, Iron Man, and Beast, Andy became the new spokesman of Horizon Labs at Mister Fantastic's suggestion to Max Modell. He was also being trained by Peter Parker's superheroic alter-ego Spider-Man.

The following days, Andy continued his superheroic career with the help of Spider-Man, although receiving a bad reception from the citizens. After observing Alpha, Jackal kidnapped the boy along with his parents, to create clones of him and build an army to control the world. Spider-Man managed to track Andy to the villain's lair, where they learned Andy's DNA was not affected by the accident, leading his newly formed clones to be powerless. After failing to absorb Alpha's power, the Jackal escaped. In the aftermath, he was emancipated from his parents.

After he was called by Spider-Man to help the Avengers to battle Terminus, Alpha used his powers carelessly, causing many aircraft to shut down, risking the lives of the passengers and people in the ground. After the Avengers managed to rescue the various passengers, Spider-Man, his Aunt May and her husband Jay Jameson from Jameson's malfunctioning private jet, Peter decided that Alpha was too irresponsible to wield the powers he had. He used Terminus' energy lance to deflect Alpha's energy to build an engine which took a huge portion of Andy's power. Spider-Man tells Andy that he will return to his parents and he will be attending high school once more. His powers are still growing, and maybe, he can be a hero again, just not as Alpha.

Six months after these events took place, Andy's parents divorced and Andy, along with his mother, moved in with Andy's grandmother. Later, the Superior Spider-Man (Otto Octavius's mind in Peter Parker's body) returned 10% of Alpha's abilities to him to harness Parker Particles to make himself more powerful. Alpha then attempted to save a woman from a mugger, but accidentally crushed the man's skull. After admitting the mugger to the Pittsburgh University Medical Center, Alpha destroys an elemental parasite, preventing it from demolishing a steel plant. He then, after saving his friend Susan "Soupcan" Rice from a restaurant fire, realizes the Parker Particles have enhanced his senses to the point that he can hear and see everything on Earth. He then visits the mugger, who awakes and vows revenge, later mutating into a tumor-like beast named Zeta. After defeating an ex-Stark International engineer named The Miller with Thor's assistance, he attempts to remove the rampaging Zeta from the hospital, but is alerted that his mother's home is burning down, at the behest of "Boss" Cohen, Pittsburgh's top crime boss. After saving his mother, he enlists Spider-Man to help destroy Zeta, but fails to completely destroy all the cancerous tissue, allowing Zeta to escape. Then, after an attempt on Soupcan's life by one of Cohen's hitmen, Alpha threatens to kill Cohen, but is deterred by the fact that Cohen knows about the mugger. He then tells Alpha to not prevent any of Cohen's crimes, or he'll release the information to the media. Andy then reveals his identity to his only other friend Duncan Kilgore and attempts to make a name for himself as protector of Pittsburgh.

Due to his exposure to the Parker Particles, Andy is now capable of continually recharging massive amounts of cosmic energy, which he can release in the form of energy blasts, super strength, super speed, force fields, telekinesis, matter manipulation, and flight. So far, however, he's only able to manifest one of his abilities at a time instead of all at once. The Superior Spider-Man noted that it is possible that Alpha is the only being capable of utilizing Parker Particles without turning into a parasitic monster, or "Zeta".

Comic Book Resources placed him as one of the superheroes Marvel wants you to forget.

Alpha the Ultimate Mutant 
Alpha the Ultimate Mutant is a fictional character appearing in American comic books published by Marvel Comics.

Alpha the Ultimate Mutant first appeared in The Defenders #15–16 (September–October 1974), and was created by Len Wein and Sal Buscema.

Alpha is a being artificially created by Magneto, a prominent mutant in the Marvel Universe.

Following an epic battle with the Avengers, Magneto is imprisoned in the center of Earth. Magneto manages to escape and propels himself towards the surface. On the way, he finds the underground ruins of a long-lost technologically advanced civilization in New Mexico. Using the machinery and books he finds among the ruins, he began bio-engineering "the ultimate mutant".

Professor X telepathically detects that Magneto and the Brotherhood of Evil Mutants are active in the area of the Carlsbad Caverns, and he summons the Defenders to launch an attack against them. Magneto and the Brotherhood manage to repel the Defenders for enough time to allow the engineering of Alpha to be completed.

Alpha emerges as an oversized humanoid of subhuman intelligence (he was characterized as "neolithic"). Initially he is only capable of creating force fields as a reflex, and of blindly following Magneto's orders. However, each time he uses his powers, Alpha's cranium widens, causing an increase to his intellect.

Magneto has Alpha teleport him and the Brotherhood of Evil Mutants to the United Nations headquarters. When his demands for world rulership are turned down, Magneto orders Alpha to telekinetically lift the Secretariat Building and suspend it in mid-air. After the Defenders attack the Brotherhood, Alpha was coerced by Magneto to retaliate in various means, including transforming the concrete pavement into autonomous "rock-men", transforming the Hulk into a stone statue, telekinetically spinning Nighthawk in the air until he lost consciousness, and fusing Valkyrie to the ground.

The rampant use of his powers eventually elevate Alpha's awareness to a superhuman level. Persuaded by Professor X, he telepathically probes both the Brotherhood of Mutants and the Defenders to discover which team was evil. Understanding that Magneto had fooled him into committing malicious acts, Alpha punishes his erstwhile allies by regressing them to infancy. He also restores the United Nations building complex and erases the event from the minds of all onlookers.

Finally, declaring himself too evolved to remain on Earth, Alpha transforms himself to a streak of light and leaves to explore the universe.

Quasar briefly glimpses Alpha, first on the Stranger's Labworld, and then during his journeys in the cosmos. From what Quasar saw, Alpha seems to be paired with another highly evolved humanoid named Futurist.

Alpha the Ultimate Mutant possesses telepathy and vast powers enabling him to transmute the elements, reconstruct matter, reverse the aging process, project force fields, teleport himself and others, fly, and survive in the vacuum of space. He possesses telekinetic powers which are enough to lift a 50-story skyscraper and the surrounding land into the air. His powers are not without limits and are presumably weaker than those of the Stranger.

Alpha the Ultimate Mutant originally had a hulking form which likely possessed great strength but lacked enough intelligence to obey commands. Within a few hours, Alpha's cranium and brain grew in size and evolved into a being of great intellect with a form to match.

Alpha the Ultimate Mutant stands at 10 feet tall, although he can alter his form at will.

Alpha the Ultimate Mutant was seen in the X-Men theme where he was seen charging towards the X-Men with the mutants on Magneto's side. He later appeared in the episode "Beyond Good and Evil" Pt. 4, amongst the psychic mutants.

Marlene Alraune 
Marlene Alraune is a fictional character appearing in American comic books published by Marvel Comics. She is an archaeologist, adviser, helper, and Moon Knight's lover. The character first appeared in Marvel Spotlight #28 (March 1976).

Marlene Alraune in other media
 In the Moon Knight series set in the Marvel Cinematic Universe, Marlene's character serves as the basis and inspiration for original character Layla El-Faouly played by May Calamawy, who shares her archaeological background, her father Abdallah El-Faouly based on Marlene's father Dr. Peter Alraune being killed by Marc's partner Raoul Bushman and having formed a relationship with Marc and becoming his wife, at first she is unaware of Marc's split personality but eventually learns of it, even forming a friendship with Marc's alternate personality Steven Grant. When she learns of Marc's supposed involvement in her father's death from Arthur Harrow and despite Marc saying he did not kill him, their relation briefly becomes strained but they reconcile. At the end of the series, she becomes the Egyptian goddess Taweret's avatar and becomes the superhero Scarlet Scarab making Layla a composite character.

Amatsu-Mikaboshi

American Ace 
American Ace is a fictional character appearing in American comic books published by Marvel Comics in the Golden Age of Comic Books. He first appeared in the uncirculated Motion Picture Funnies Weekly #1 starring in his own story in 1939. The character would make his first public appearance when his strip was reprinted and later continued in Marvel Mystery Comics #2 and #3.

Perry Webb 
Perry Webb was an American miner who traveled in his private plane internationally in search of rare minerals, such as radium. On one such search, he set out to the Balkan nation of Attainia. However his timing was unfortunate since a neighbouring country, Castile d'Or declared war on Attainia over the assassination of their arch-duke by an Attainian extremist. Promising the citizens of Castile D'Or "justice", the formerly exiled Queen Ursula became chancellor and invaded Attainia, when it was in fact she who was behind the assassination. Meanwhile, Webb had landed and was horrified as the bombings began. Having saved a girl called Jeanie, from being crushed by a falling tower, he was rewarded by being taken to her family's cottage. Falling in love, Webb, however chose to leave Attainia. His plane was shot down and Webb was wounded severely. After making his recovery, he vowed he would have vengeance against Castile'D'Or.

During the "Last Days" part of the "Secret Wars" storyline, Perry was seen as a resident of Valhalla Villas (a retirement home for ex-heroes and ex-villains). He is among the residents that were temporarily de-aged during the Incursion between Earth-616 and Earth-1610.

Ace Masters 
Another "American Ace" appeared in 2011. Ace Masters is a homosexual yet married fighter pilot. He first appeared in issue #4 of the maxi-series All Winners Squad: Band of Heroes.

American Dream

American Eagle

Americop
Americop (Bartholomew "Bart" Gallows) is a fictional vigilante appearing in American comic books published by Marvel Comics.

Americop first appeared in Captain America #428 (June 1994), and was created by Mark Gruenwald and Dave Hoover.

Bart Gallows was born in Sugar Land, Texas and later became a police officer in Houston, Texas. Disillusioned at the law's inability to protect society from crime, he resigned from the force and became a vigilante named Americop.

He travels across America and uses a police scanner to track down criminals. He is not above executing the criminals he thinks deserve said fate. He sometimes takes money from the drug-trafficking criminals he battles, keeping half and donating the rest to drug rehabilitation programs. Americop finds himself in conflict with Captain America while trying to bring down a child exploitation ring; Captain America is appalled by his brutality.

Americop's investigation led him to the New Orleans mansion of indestructible munitions magnate Damon Dran. Although initially subdued by a gas grenade attack and imprisoned alongside Captain America, he manages to break free. During the fight, he kills several of Dran's mercenaries. During the resulting fight, he shoots down Dran's helicopter. Americop believes Dran died during the crash when the criminal in fact survived.

After the super-hero Civil War, Americop is a target on the Thunderbolts' Most Wanted list. Norman Osborn sends Penance and Bullseye to battle Americop, with the secret hope the vigilante will kill the two (as both haven't been worth the trouble). Instead, the two crash Americop's truck and Bullseye causes Penance's stored-up energy to be unleashed, which fries 80 percent of the vigilante's synaptic nerve endings.

He later died (presumably from his injuries).

The Americop uniform and code name were later copied by a private security force called the Americops run by Keane Industries.

Amphibian 

Amphibian (Kingsley Rice) is the name of two fictional characters in the Marvel multiverse, members of alternate versions of the fictional Squadron Supreme.

The original character was inspired from Namor and first appeared in The Avengers #148 (June 1976).

A founding member of the Squadron Supreme, Kingsley is part of the team after the Overmind uses the Squadron to take control of the world. When the Squadron announces its Utopia program, intended to solve all the world's ills, Amphibian openly objects, but is overruled by the majority of his teammates. As the team enacts their program, Rice becomes increasingly disillusioned and distanced from his teammataes, feeling his opinions are not being respected. He finally reaches breaking point when the Golden Archer admits to using the team's Behavior Modification technology on squadmate Lark to make her love him. Enraged by what he sees as the Squadron's double standard, he surreptitiously destroys the devices, then departs the team, vowing never to return to the surface again.

The series Supreme Power featured a female version of the character, also named Kingsley Rice. This version was created by J. Michael Straczynski and Gary Frank, and first appeared in Supreme Power #2 (November 2003).

In the 2021 "Heroes Reborn" reality, Amphibian is a member of the Secret Squadron. During the fight with Siege Society, Amphibian was beheaded by Baron Helmut Zemo. Tom Thumb, Nighthawk, and Blur mourn the deaths of their fallen comrades Amphibian, Arcanna Jones, Blue Eagle, and Golden Archer.

Amphibion 
Qnax. The sometimes ally, sometimes enemy of Hulk, and a warrior champion of the planet Xantares, with great superhuman strength.

Amphibius 
Formerly a Swamp Men tribesman that lived in the Savage Land. He is saved from hostile tribesmen by Magneto, and changed into a humanoid frog-like mutate, becoming one of the Savage Land Mutates. e is the first of the Savage Land Mutates to see the X-Men, and has fought not just the X-Men but also Ka-Zar, who is a human inhabitant of the Savage Land. He has also fought Spider-Man. Amphibius is one of Magneto's first Savage Land Mutates, and has been involved in all the Mutates' subsequent activities.

Anachronism 

Anachronism was created by Dennis Hopeless and Kev Walker, and first appeared in Avengers Arena #1. He is one of sixteen teenagers kidnapped by Arcade and forced to fight to the death. After escaping, he and some of the other survivors train with Madame Masque.

Anaconda 

Anaconda (Blanche Sitznski) is a fictional supervillain appearing in American comic books published by Marvel Comics. She has generally been associated with the Serpent Society, often as foes of Captain America. Sitznski was given her superhuman abilities by the Roxxon corporation, giving her the codename Anaconda due to her powerful, adamantium-enhanced arms she uses to constrain or crush her opponents with. Her first appearance was as part of the Serpent Squad where they tried to retrieve the Serpent Crown only to be thwarted by Thing, Stingray and Triton. She later became a core member of Sidewinder's Serpent Squad and remained a member when they became the Serpent Society.

Anarchist

Anansi

Kwaku Anansi first appeared as an unnamed god in Thor #398 by Tom DeFalco and Ron Frenz and made his named appearance in The Amazing Spider-Man (vol. 2) #48 by J. Michael Straczynski and John Romita Jr.

Anansi was a member of the Vodu, deities worshipped by the tribes of Africa. According to Ezekiel Sims and the Ashanti tribe in Ghana, Anansi was the very first Spider-Man who used his powers to travel through Africa. Anansi made a deal with the Sky God, Nyame, offering his eternal service in exchange for more enlightenment and after transmitting his power and knowledge to the Great Web, he vanished. His temple was then used by Peter Parker to defeat the totemic wasp entity, Shathra and was then used as a battle arena, when Peter and Ezekiel started fighting to appease totemic entity, the Gatekeeper.

During "Spider-Island", Anansi was disguised as a pest specialist known as A. Nancy and visited Hercules at the place where Hercules was working. After talking for a bit, Hercules helped Nancy to sneak into Arachne's apartment to steal her Tapestry. After that, Nancy was attacked by Elektra who stole the tapestry, but left Nancy alive, even though Baba Yaga had ordered her to kill him.

Other versions of Anansi
In Spider-Man: Fairy Tales, a version of Anansi appears where he faces several gods during his quest. During the "Spider-Verse" event, he is recruited by Spider-UK into joining the Spider-Army to battle the Inheritors.

Anansi in other media
Anansi appears in Spider-Man Unlimited.

Ancient One

Andromeda

Anelle
Anelle is a Skrull princess, the heir to the Skrull Empire, and the daughter of Emperor Dorrek VII and Empress R'Kill. The character first appeared in Fantastic Four #37, and was created by Stan Lee and Jack Kirby. She often opposed her father Dorrek VII's policies, preferring peace to his aggressive military policies.

She falls in love with Warlord Morrat, but he is executed for treason by firing squad after a failed coup d'état against Emperor Dorrek VII. She leaps in front of the weapon-fire in an attempt to save him, but the Invisible Woman surrounds her with a force field and saves her life.

The Super-Skrull desires her, but she is not interested in the least. In an attempt to win her hand, he captures the Kree Captain Marvel, the Scarlet Witch, and Quicksilver, but her father interprets it as an attempt to usurp him and imprisons him instead. Anelle and the Kree man fall in love and have an illicit relationship, leading to the birth of future Young Avenger Hulkling. The emperor orders the baby put to death as soon as he realizes who the father is, but Anelle has her nurse smuggle the child off-world and he ends up on Earth with the nurse raising him. Galactus later consumes the Skrull Throneworld, and Anelle is among the billions who perish.

Anelle in other media
 Anelle appears in the 1967 Fantastic Four episode "Behold, A Distant Star", voiced by Ginny Tyler.
 Anelle appears in the 1994 Fantastic Four episode, also entitled "Behold, A Distant Star", voiced by Mary Kay Bergman.
 Anelle appears in The Super Hero Squad Show two-part episode "Another Order of Evil!", voiced by Tara Strong.

Angar the Screamer 

Angar the Screamer (David Alan Angar, also known as Scream) is a supervillain, created by Steve Gerber, Gene Colan, and John Tartaglione, who first appeared in Daredevil #100 (June 1973).

David Angar volunteers for an experiment that subjects his vocal cords to hypersound, granting him the ability to scream loudly and cause hallucinations. He becomes an assassin and tries to kill Daredevil and Black Widow. He later enters a relationship with similarly powered Screaming Mimi. He is shot during a robbery and dies. The Fixer takes Angar's body and experiments on his larynx, resurrecting Angar as the abstract sound being Scream. Scream joins the Redeemers and his form is dispersed by Graviton. He manages to restore himself and goes on a rampage until Songbird disperses him for good.

Angar the Screamer in other media 
 David A. Angar appears in the Agents of S.H.I.E.L.D. episode "One of Us", portrayed by Jeff Daniel Phillips. As a result of an experimental cancer treatment, this version's voice can render any living thing catatonic. He is freed from his imprisonment by Calvin Zabo to join his Slicing Talons. Arriving at a football stadium in Manitowoc, Wisconsin, Zabo removes Angar's muzzle so the latter can use his abilities on everyone and everything in the vicinity. However, Phil Coulson's team of S.H.I.E.L.D. agents intervene, during which Coulson knocks out Angar.
 Angar the Screamer appears in the animated Hulu series M.O.D.O.K., voiced by Bill Hader. This version was once the lead singer of a 60s rock band called "Sweetleg", which he is prone to reminisce on.

Angel

Thomas Halloway

Simon Halloway

Warren Worthington III

Angel Dust

Angela

Dirk Anger

Ani-Mator

Annex

Annihilus

Anole

Answer 
The Answer is the name of three connected fictional comic book characters appearing in American comic books published by Marvel Comics.

Aaron Nicholson 
Aaron Nicholson first appeared in Peter Parker, the Spectacular Spider-Man #92. He is a criminal genius and a former member of the Kingpin's criminal organization. He is also a former hitman in the Las Vegas division of HYDRA and was empowered by the laboratory machines of Dr. Farley Stillwell's brother Dr. Harlan Stillwell where he became the Answer.

The Answer studies Spider-Man's powers, and then attacks Spider-Man and the Black Cat to test the limits of their powers. He then kidnaps the Black Cat to misdirect Spider-Man's attention as he steals Silvermane's body from the police morgue, and assisted the Kingpin in partially restoring Silvermane's life. He then kidnapped Dagger in hopes that her powers would cure the Kingpin's ailing wife. Silvermane rampages mindlessly; to end the rampage, the Answer sacrifices his corporeal form and converts himself to energy to revive Dagger, who possesses Silvermane's life-force.

The Answer later telepathically contacts Doctor Octopus who restores his corporeal existence. The Answer ends up fighting with Octavius and is defeated by him. He later appears in the Raft where he escapes but is captured by Toxin.

It is later revealed that he had been feigning bad luck to reunite with his unrequited love Ruby Thursday, before her body is killed by Bullseye.

During the "Civil War: War Crimes" storyline, he is seen among an army of super-villains organized by Hammerhead that is captured by Iron Man and S.H.I.E.L.D. agents.

He and multiple other supervillains attend a wake for Stilt-Man at a bar. Disguised as a barman, the Punisher poisons drinks and then blows up the bar.

Answer has since been hired by the Hood to take advantage of the split in the superhero community caused by the Superhuman Registration Act. He helps them fight the New Avengers but is taken down by Doctor Strange. He appeared in Brand New Day as one of the villains in the bar confronting Spider-Man.

He is one of many prisoners who escaped from the Raft at the start of the Secret Invasion. He later joins the Hood's crime syndicate and works with them on numerous occasions.

The first Answer underwent genetic manipulation to grant him the ability to develop any power needed in a certain situation. For example, if surrounded by thugs, he will gain superhuman strength and durability, allowing him to defeat them. In another situation, he may obtain pyrokinesis or the ability to turn himself into pure energy. Flight may be an ability that is always active. Other than that, at rest or not in any sort of situation, he will display no abilities. The powers he manifests typically last for five minutes, and he can display up to two separate powers at once. He also has superhuman intelligence and intuition. The Answer wears body armor that was created with the help of the Kingpin's scientists. The armor is coated with a friction-eliminating chemical that allows him to slip from any grasp or prevent anything from adhering to him.

David Ferrari 
After Aaron Nicholson's "death", S.H.I.E.L.D. agent David Ferrari took the name of Answer in Captain America (vol. 3) #42. He was a former agent of S.H.I.E.L.D. as well as a member of the U.S. Army and Furnace. He was also the former ally of the Crimson Dynamo and the brother of Connie. He led a mission to an A.I.M. base to prevent the release of the Omega Compound, however he released two drops to destroy the base. He later uses drugs to control Nick Fury, at which point he had allied himself with the Crimson Dynamo in attempt to steal missiles from Khamistan to take over the world. He was opposed by Captain America.

Unnamed criminal 
After Aaron Nicholson lost his physical form, his gear was sold to Roderick Kingsley who gave it to an unknown criminal. He was present when Hobgoblin (who was actually Roderick Kingsley's butler Claude) led his forces into battle against the Goblin King's Goblin Nation. After Hobgoblin was killed by Goblin King, Answer was among the villains that defected to the Goblin Nation.

Following Spider-Man's victory over the Goblin King, Answer was with the other former Hobgoblin minions at the Bar with No Name where they encounter Electro.

Anthem

Ant-Man

Hank Pym

Scott Lang

Eric O'Grady

Anti-Venom

Eddie Brock

Unnamed host

Flash Thompson

Apache Kid

Ape-Man

Monk Keefer

Roy McVey

Unnamed version

Ape-X 
Ape-X is the name of different characters in Marvel Comics

Ape-X (Earth-712) 

Ape-X is a super intelligent ape in the Squadron Supreme universe. The character, created by Mark Gruenwald, presumably as a pastiche of Gorilla Grodd, first appeared in Squadron Supreme #5 in January 1986. Within the context of the stories, Ape-X was a member of the Institute of Evil. Enemies of the Squadron, they abduct the team's scientist Tom Thumb, and subject him to his own Behavior Modification technology, hoping to turn Tom against his teammates while holding the Squadron's loved ones hostage to prevent reprisals. However, when the Squadron are all captured, it transpires Tom had designed the technology so it wouldn't affect any Squadron member, after Golden Archer had already misused the technology. Ape-X and the rest of the Institute are subdued and subject to the B-Mod device, turning them into loyal members of the Squadron. Ape-X goes on to serve as a scientific expert for the team, assisting Tom Thumb in his attempt to cure all human disease. While her brainwashing prevents Ape-X from directly committing crimes, she is able to suggest courses of action Tom might hypothetically take. However, their efforts prove fruitless, and Tom succumbs to his own cancer. In her grief, Ape-X begins attempting to construct a robot duplicate of Tom. In the meantime, she also assists Hyperion, who has become blinded following a fight with a villainous copy of himself. When Moonglow infiltrates the Squadron's files, Ape-X is alerted to this by Tom's AI, AIDA. However, her brainwashing prevents Ape-X from taking any action against a member of the Squadron, and the logical dichotomy gives Ape-X an anyuerysm, preventing her from warning them.

Ape-X (Marvel Apes) 
An unrelated Ape-X, created by Karl Kesel and Ramon Bachs, appeared in Marvel Apes #1. This version is a monkey that wears a wrestler mask that enables him to turn into a super-powered gorilla.

Apocalypse

Apollo

Aquarius

Darren Bentley 
Darren Bentley is a founding member of the Zodiac, and his base of operations was San Francisco, California.

The Zodiac was infiltrated by Nick Fury, posing as Scorpio; the Zodiac fought the Avengers and escaped. Aquarius, Capricorn, and Sagittarius sought to recapture the Zodiac Key, but lost it to the Brotherhood of the Ankh.

Led by Taurus, the Zodiac later attempted to kill all Manhattan residents born under the sign of Gemini as a show of power, but were thwarted by the Avengers. Taurus's faction attempted to kill the Zodiac dissident faction, but all twelve leaders were captured by the Avengers.

After learning he had cancer, Aquarius made a bargain with the demon Slifer: in return for his soul, Aquarius was granted one year of life and the supernatural ability to take on the forms of his fellow Zodiac leaders. However, after Aquarius took on the other Zodiac forms one time each (thereby representing a zodiacal year) while battling Ghost Rider, Slifer returned and claimed his body and soul.

Zachary Drebb
Taurus ordered Aquarius II and third Aries to kill Iron Man (James Rhodes), but both failed. A new android LMD version of the Zodiac appeared, led by Scorpio in a new android body, massacred the human Zodiac, and took over their criminal operations.

Aquarius (LMD)
An android Aquarius was a Life Model Decoy created by Scorpio (Jacob Fury) to be part of his Zodiac crime organization. Scorpio went after his brother, Nick Fury, with his new group, but was defeated by Defenders and Moon Knight. The Zodiac LMD's were recruited by Quicksilver during his bout with temporary insanity, and Quicksilver ordered the Zodiac LMD's to destroy Avengers for their imagined wrongdoings. The Avengers managed to defeat the group and most were remanded into federal custody.

The android Zodiac were soon released, and the Scorpio LMD rebuilt a number of them. Scorpio used the Zodiac Key to create LMDs that exemplified the forces and personalities inherent in each sign, hoping to create great strength in the combination of all twelve traits of the Zodiac. He arranged the ambush in which the android Zodiac killed all of the remaining human Zodiac leaders except Cornelius van Lunt, alias Taurus. It was later revealed the Libra had also survived the attack on the original Zodiac Cartel. Immediately afterward, Van Lunt sought out the services of the Avengers' West Coast branch to confront and defeat the android Zodiac. He was destroyed by Hawkeye in a battle with the West Coast Avengers.

The Zodiac Key immediately resurrected the Scorpio LMD. Claiming superiority and believing that the Zodiac would eventually kill the Avengers as the androids could never be stopped, Scorpio wanted to use the Key to transport everyone on the scene to the Key's native dimension where the conflict, he believed, could be prolonged indefinitely. However, when the androids were in the other dimension, they ceased to function because each of them were aligned with a particular zodiacal energy, energy that did not exist in the other dimension. The Avengers found Hawkeye and Tigra had been sent to the same dimension and, reunited, the team was sent back to Earth by the Brotherhood. However, secretly the Brotherhood waited so that someday they could also send the Key to Earth again and create new conflicts for them.

Aquarius (Ecliptic)
Aquarius was a later addition to the Zodiac. A man of few words, he tended to remain in the background despite his power. He was killed with the rest of the Zodiac by Weapon X.

Thanos' Aquarius
The fifth Aquarius is an unnamed male that Thanos recruited to join his incarnation of the Zodiac. He and the other Zodiac members perish when Thanos abandons them on the self-destructing Helicarrier where Cancer was the only survivor.

Aquarius in other media
Aquarius appears in Marvel Anime: Iron Man as a mech utilized by Zodiac. It attaches itself to a JSDF satellite to project a radiation beam from its solar panels down into Iron Man's Arc Station and irradiate most of the surrounding area, causing a sickness that attacks white blood cells around Tokyo. Using Dr. Chika Tanaka's prototype booster technology and a ride from Captain Nagato Sakurai, Iron Man reaches the satellite and destroys the Aquarius mech.

Aqueduct

Arabian Knight

Abdul Qamar

Navid Hashim

Aragorn

Arakko 
Expressively female, Arakko is a sentient island, created several thousands years prior to the Modern Age in the South Pacific alongside its twin male counterpart, Krakoa, when the island's true form, Okkara, was attacked by an enemy from another dimension, that wielding a twilight sword split it into the two single islands which created a rift into the invading dimension. A great number of mutants, among them Apocalypse and his family, were living in Okkara when it was attacked. With his children forming the First Horsemen, Apocalypse and his wife Genesis were successful in pushing back the enemy's armies but to seal the rift, Genesis decided to make the ultimate sacrifice and lead the First Horsemen and the entire mutant population along with Arakko to the other side of the breach, to shut it and deny the enemy's forces access to Earth, while Apocalypse remained on Earth to become stronger.

Arak Coral
A small remnant of Arakko, known as Arak Coral was later sent to Earth by the survivours of Arrako. Mysteriously appearing 100 miles south of Krakoa, the small island immediately began heading towards the other island. After Aurora and Northstar surveyed the island and observed hostile life forms, Cyclops went to the island with Prestige and Cable to investigate. On the island, the trio encountered Summoner and several monsters. Once communication was established between the parties, the Arak Coral was able to merge with Krakoa becoming the southwestern edge of the island. Later that day, when Summoner finally met Apocalypse, he reported Arakko's situation to him, and reveals how his grandmother, Genesis, was seemingly killed by the dark god of Amenth, Annihilation, the dark forces of the Amenthi daemons destroyed Arakko's towers, allowing them to finally attack its mutant population. While countless mutants were slaughtered, the Summoner was sent with a portion of Arakko to find his grandfather outside the Amenth dimension, as he was the only one who could help them save Arakko from its enemies.[

The part of Arak Coral became known as the "bad place" due to its monsters and was mainly avoided by the mutants. However, while playing, Curse lost Fauna in the "bad place". Curse recruited Cable, Pixie, and Armor to find Fauna. They were able to find Fauna and rescue him from a monster, and Cable found the Light of Galador.

While preparing to save his family and Arakko, Apocalypse created the External Gate in the Eternal Caldera by sacrificing four of his fellow Externals. With the External Gate open, Krakoa was linked directly to Otherworld. With Unus and Banshee by his side, the Summoner entered the portal so he could make his way back home but when he reunited with his mother and the rest of the Horsemen leading an armada of daemons, they turned on Banshee and Unus. After capturing Unus, the Summoner returned an injured Banshee to Krakoa, and, alongside Apocalypse, he told the Quiet Council of Krakoa about the armadas of daemons. The Council initially decided to destroy the External Gate, but Krakoa refused to let them destroy the portal, instead choosing to send Apocalypse, the Summoner, and other volunteers to go fight the horde. After entering Otherworld, Apocalypse was reunited with his children, the First Horsemen, but they, along with the Summoner, attacked him. The Summoner then proceeded to kill Rockslide. The fight was broken up by the Omniversal Majestrix Saturnyne, who offered each side to participate in a Contest of Swords for victory, to which they agreed.

Swords of X
As it turns out, Arakko and its mutant population ended up on the dimension of Amenth, a dimension filled with various Daemons and ruled by the dark god Annihilation, a mystical being that exists as a golden helm and needs a host to interact with the outside world. Once there, one tenth of the Arakki mutants fled into the wasteland, overwhelmed by the demonic nature of Amenth. Some of the mutants were later captured by the forces of Annihilation and forced to breed with Daemons to create a new warrior sub-race, the Summoners. The mutant alchemists and wizards combined their powers to create ten towers which would protect them from the Daemons' threat. As thousands of years passed, the mutants kept warring with the enemies in a seemingly never endless war. Eventually Genesis, gathered an army and went out of Arakko into a years old journey to end the enemies' threat for good, but she and what left of the army returned after a disastrous encounter with fellow mutant and former ally White Sword. Then after Genesis' own sister, Isca the Unbeaten, also defected to the Amenthi, and told Genesis that Annihilation, challenged her to a fight for victory, Genesis accepted the challenge, but apparently lost. This left the Daemon armies to destroy Arakko's towers and finally set the island on fire. As countless mutants kept being slaughtered by the enemies, the last survivors send the Summoner, son of the Horseman of War, to go find his grandfather for him and Krakoa to help them defeat the enemies. However in truth, Genesis had actually won but refused to put on the helm and therefore becoming Annihilation's new host. Without a proper leader, the Daemons were left without a leash and attacked Arakko in full strength as Genesis was kept a prisoner until she saw the horde finally cracking the walls of Arakko, prompting the desperate Arakki to open a portal to Dryador in search of aid. Realizing that all was lost, Genesis donned the helm, merged with the entity, and the mutants of Arakko would therefore serve Annihilation. Arakko was then forcefully turned into a vassal state with Vile School omnipaths and stealth suppressors imbedded in to uncover militant thought and defuse any attempted uprisings. The Abyssal Prisons were constructed and overseen by Tarn the Uncaring, where countless mutant lives were lost.

With Arakko secured, Annihilation sent Summoner, son of the Horseman of War, to go find his grandfather, ostensibly in order for him and the mutants of Krakoa to help them defeat the demons, but in truth, to trick him into opening a gateway between Amenth and Krakoa, paving the way for the demons to invade Earth, while the united forces of Arakko and Amenth laid waste to Dryador. When the Summoner returned to assemble their Swordbearers, which included Redroot, Arakko's translator, the Summoner informed Arakko that sadly it would not be joined with its other anytime soon. However, following the war between Amenth and Krakoa, as prize for his victory, Omniversal Majestrix Saturnyne exchanged Apocalypse with Arakko, returning the island and its mutant population back to Earth.

After finally returning to Earth, Arakko tried to reunite with Krakoa, but time had changed both of them, even speaking two totally different languages and apparently didn't love each other anymore, so they both decided to stay separate.

Planet Arakko
During the first annual Hellfire Gala and realizing the difficulties in accommodating a massive population of warlike mutants on Earth, Magneto proposed a plan to terraform Mars and re-locate Arakko and its inhabitants there in a power play that claim the red planet as the capital of the solar system and the first mutant world. The Great Ring consented to the plan and lent their aid. After the planet was made hospitable for life during the Hellfire Gala, Exodus, with the aid of Jean Grey and Lactuca the Knower, uprooted the island and sent it to Mars.
 
Storm helps create a new landmark on the planet, the Lake Hellias Diplomatic Ring, intended to serve as the ultimate place for peace to be spoken of and achieved in the Solar System. Xilo even uses his powers to create statues of Apocalypse and Genesis within a massive valley, with the promise of only peace can existe in this sacred space. Jamie Braddock then uses his powers to literally give birth to a second space station for S.W.O.R.D. ready to defend Arakko against any invaders or enemies. As one final touch, Jamie even creates Port Prometheus, a docking station for all visitors to come to. Storm and Magneto then plant a Krakoa Gate, which will allow the X-Men and their allies from Krakoa to visit Mars, now redubbed Planet Arakko and proclaimed to be the new capital of the Sol System.

The Great Ring of Arakko
 Bold indicates current members as of 2022.

Arcade

Arcanna

Squadron Supreme 
Arcanna Jones, created by J. M. DeMatteis and Don Perlin, first appeared in The Defenders #112 (October 1982).

Arcanna's magical abilities allow her to become a professional crime fighter to support her family, and she joins the Squadron Supreme.

With the Squadron, she travels to a different universe. When they return, Arcanna discovers the nature of magic changed while she was away and that she will have to relearn all of her skills. Instead, she chooses to retire from adventuring to be with her family.

Supreme Power 
This version of the character, created by J. Michael Straczynski and Gary Frank, first appeared in Supreme Power #18 (April 2005).

Arcanna Jones is able to observe and affect parallel quantum dimensions. During a fight with Hyperion, the interaction between their powers causes them to travel two years into the future.

Arcanna and the rest of the heroes of her world were killed by the Cabal during an Incursion, with their world's Nighthawk as the only survivor.

Heroes Reborn version 
In the 2021 "Heroes Reborn" reality, Arcanna is a member of the Secret Squadron. During the fight with the Siege Society, Arcanna was locked in combat with Silver Witch before being vanquished by her. Tom Thumb, Nighthawk, and Blur mourn the deaths of their fallen comrades Amphibian, Arcanna Jones, Blue Eagle, and Golden Archer.

Arclight

Ares

Ariel 11 

Ariel 11 is an extraterrestrial mutant. Created by Jo Duffy and Kerry Gammill, the character first appeared in Fallen Angels #1. Like others of her race, she is able to teleport. On Earth, she encounters the mutant criminal Vanisher and joins the group of adolescents who work for him as thieves, known as the Fallen Angels. She later allies herself with the X-Men.

Aries

Marcus Lassiter

Grover Raymond

LMD

Oscar Gordon

Ecliptic

Thanos

Marauders

Arishem the Judge

Arkon

Armadillo

Armless Tiger Man 
Gustav Hertz, better known as the Armless Tiger Man, is a supervillain who first appeared in the 1940s, then fell into obscurity for decades before being revived in stories set during the WWII era. As the name indicates, the Armless Tiger Man does not have any arms, having lost them in an industrial accident in his youth. Instead, he is a skilled fighter with his sharpened teeth and feet. Being recruited by the Gestapo he was used as a Nazi-henchman in several Marvel comic stories set in World War II. He was originally an enemy of the Golden Age Angel but also had run-ins with Captain America as well as the WW II-era Black Panther. Armless Tiger Man first appeared in Marvel Mystery Comics #26 and was created by Paul Gustavson and Al Bellman.

Armless Tiger Man in other media 
Armless Tiger Man appears in a teaser image for Season Two of Marvel: Avengers Alliance, parodying the cover of X-Men 141, the opening issue of Days of Future Past. He is one of the victims of the Circle of Eight and is found dead alongside Lady Octopus.

Armor

Armory 
Armory (Violet Lightner) first appeared in Avengers: The Initiative #1 and was created by Dan Slott and Stefano Casselli.

A suicidal girl from San Francisco, Violet Lightner's attempt at killing herself failed when she bonded with the alien superweapon known as the Tactigon, an empathic weapon capable of anticipating the needs of its host. Finding new purpose in life, Violet used the weapon to fight crime, and joined the Fifty States Initiative. On her first day at Camp Hammond, Armory was involved in a training accident that saw the death of fellow trainee Michael Van Patrick. Lightner was summarily drummed out of the Initiative and the Tactigon surgically removed. Violet then went into therapy, refusing to disclose the circumstances that led to her expulsion to her psychiatrist, who unknown to her was working for Henry Peter Gyrich.

Aron 
Aron the Rogue Watcher is a fictional character appearing in American comic books published by Marvel Comics. He is the nephew of Uatu. Aron first appeared in Captain Marvel #39 and was created by Steve Englehart and Al Milgrom.

Aron originally dwelt upon the Watchers' homeworld with the other members of his race. He observed Captain Mar-Vell and Rick Jones battling Mad-Eye, and then attended the trial of Uatu. Aron was seen alongside Uatu again later.

Aron decided to forsake the Watchers' oath and actively participate in events on Earth, becoming an instigator and manipulator. He set Dragon Man against She-Hulk and She-Thing, and obtained cell samples from the Thing and She-Thing. Aron observed the Fantastic Four battling Graviton, and witnessed the events of Inferno. Aron was in turn observed by Necrodamus. Aron then joined forces with the Frightful Four against the Fantastic Four, but soon quit the Frightful Four. Aron created clones of the Fantastic Four and She-Thing, and imprisoned the real Fantastic Four and Frightful Four members in suspended animation, and watched their dreams. He replaced the real Fantastic Four with his clones, and set them against the Mole Man. Aron continued to engineer "adventures" for his clones, causing them to appear as criminals. The clones battled the Avengers and Doctor Strange, and were ultimately defeated by the real Fantastic Four after the originals broke free. Aron settled for watching the dreams of the clones instead.

When the entire species of the Watchers faced extinction at the hands of the Celestials, Aron planned to plunge either Earth's solar system or its galaxy (the narration is not entirely clear) into a pocket universe, which he intended to live on in. He even collaborated with Dark Raider (the Mister Fantastic of Earth-944) to further his goals. However, his plan was thwarted by the expanded Fantastic Four and their allies, and Aron was reduced to energy by his uncle Uatu. For this action, Uatu was stripped of his position as a Watcher. Uatu believed that Aron's energies would serve as the core around which to create a new "One", the sentient repository of all the Watchers' knowledge, whose predecessor had been destroyed by the Celestial Exitar the Exterminator.

As a member of the Watchers, the level of Aron's physical and mental abilities are unknown, and potentially incalculable by human standards. He has the ability to manipulate cosmic energy for various effects, including the ability to convert his body into energy for travel through hyperspace, and projection of cosmic energy as concussive force, molecular manipulation of matter, inter-dimensional teleportation, creation of force fields, levitation, size transformations, alteration of his physical appearance, and enhancement of his physical attributes. He possesses virtual immortality, bolstered by treatment with "delta-rays" (though Watchers can die by losing the will to live).

He has also developed his vast psionic powers through training, and his powers include telepathy, illusion-casting, and energy-manipulation powers.

Aron has access to various alien artifacts and technology as needed. Through unknown means, Aron created a special armor that shields him from detection by his fellow Watchers.

Arsenal

Arsenic

Artemis 
Artemis is the goddess of the hunt and the moon in the Olympian pantheon. Zeus is her father, and Apollo is her brother.

Asbestos Man

Mike Asher

Asp

Astra

Imperial Guard 

Astra is a member of the Shi'ar Imperium's Imperial Guard. The character, created by Chris Claremont and Dave Cockrum, first appeared in The Uncanny X-Men #107. Astra has the ability to become intangible, allowing her to pass through solid objects. She can also use her power offensively, phasing her hand into her opponent and becoming partly solid, which gives them a physical shock and renders them unconscious. Like many original members of the Imperial Guard, Astra is the analog of a character from DC Comics' Legion of Super-Heroes: in her case Phantom Girl.

Astra is a founding member of the Shi'ar Imperial Guard. She and the Guard first clash with the X-Men and Starjammers, on behalf of D'Ken and Davan Shakari, over the fate of the Shi'ar Empress Lilandra Neramani. After the battle, Lilandra takes over as Majestrix, and the Guard swears allegiance to her.

When Deathbird becomes Empress, she commands the entire Imperial Guard to fight the combined forces of the Starjammers and Excalibur on Earth so that she could claim the power of the Phoenix Force for herself. The Guard are forced to retreat when Deathbird is put in danger. Some time later, the Guardsmen again come into conflict with the X-Men regarding Dark Phoenix, this time at the behest of Empress Lilandra.

Astra takes part in the "Operation: Galactic Storm" crossover event, which ran through Marvel Comics' Avengers-related titles in 1992. "Operation: Galactic Storm" details an intergalactic war between the Shi'ar and the Kree. Astra and the Imperial Guard steal the original Captain Marvel's Nega-Bands from the dead hero's tomb. Using Kree artifacts, including the Bands, the Sh'iar create a massive super weapon, the "Nega-Bomb." Ultimately, the Nega-Bomb device is successfully detonated, devastating the Kree Empire, with billions dying instantaneously (98% of the Kree population). The Shi'ar annex the remnants of the Kree Empire, with Deathbird becoming viceroy of the Kree territories.

Some time later, Ronan the Accuser leads the Kree in a surprise attack against the Shi'ar, using the Inhumans as an army to disrupt the Shi'ar control of the Kree. Ronan seizes control in a surprise attack and forces the Inhumans and their king, Black Bolt, to obey, threatening to otherwise destroy the Inhumans' home of Attilan. He compels Karnak, Gorgon, and Triton to covertly join the Imperial Guard, while Black Bolt and Medusa attempt the assassination of the Shi'ar ruler Lilandra at a ceremony ratifying an alliance between the Shi'ar and the Spartoi. Black Bolt manages to defeat Ronan in personal combat; the attempt on Lilandra's life fails because the shapeshifter Hobgoblin dies in her place.

The Imperial Guard is commanded to stop the conqueror Vulcan, who is determined to destroy the Shi'ar empire as revenge against former emperor D'Ken for murdering Vulcan's mother. Gladiator captures and delivers Vulcan to a Shi'ar prison facility. A Shi'ar agent, however, wishing a return to the days of D'Ken's rule, frees Vulcan and together with Deathbird the pair stage a coup and usurp Lilandra. Vulcan escapes with the aid of some rebellious Shi'ar and leads a successful coup against Lilandra, becoming the next Shi'ar Emperor. Gladiator and the Imperial Guard are honor-bound to serve him.

Vulcan consolidates his rule over the Shi'ar — with the Guard reluctantly assisting — as their forces destroy a race of ancient enemies, the Scy'ar Tal, and capture the rebel Starjammers. Vulcan begins to expand the empire, leading to a war with the Kree. When ordered to kill Lilandra, Gladiator and the Guard abandon their post to protect her. During an attempt to return her to the throne, however, she is assassinated.

Vulcan is killed during a battle with the leader of the Kree, Black Bolt. With no one in line to inherit the throne, civil war threatens the Shi'ar empire. Gladiator accepts an offer to be Emperor to avoid further conflict. Mentor takes over as praetor of the Guard.

Astra is part of other missions with the Imperial Guard, including the trial of Jean Grey and the events surrounding the birth of Xandra, the progeny of Charles Xavier and Lilandra Neramani.

Brotherhood 

Astra is a mutant created by Alan Davis and first appearing in The Uncanny X-Men #366.

She is one of Magneto's first recruits from his original Brotherhood of Evil Mutants. She does not share Magneto's goals, and the two part ways as enemies. Years later, she revives a mindwiped Magneto and clones him. Astra orders the clone to kill the original, but the clone loses the battle and joins the X-Men under the name "Joseph". Astra later uses him against Magneto and the X-Men. Astra later recreates Joseph without memories and programs him to hate humankind. She also creates mutated clones of other Brotherhood members. The Stepford Cuckoos uncover Astra's collaboration with Christopher Bach, president of the organization Humans Now, to restore fear to Magneto's name. Magneto defeated Joseph and his clone Brotherhood, but Astra escapes.

Vance Astro

Astronomer

Atalanta

Athena

Atlas

Attuma

Atum 

Atum (also known as Demogorge) is a being in the Marvel Universe, named after the Egyptian god Atum. The character, created by Alan Zelenetz, first appeared in Thor Annual #10 in 1982.

Within the context of the stories, Atum is the son of the entity known as the Demiurge and the Elder God Gaea. A golden humanoid imbued with the power of the Sun itself, Atum kills the warring Elder Gods and, absorbing their life force, is changed by their evil energies and devolves into a huge, hulking demonic being – Demogorge, the God Eater. Only Chthon and Set survive by fleeing into alternate dimensions. With Gaea the only Elder God remaining, the God Eater sheds the Elder Gods' energies and becomes Atum, journeying to the Sun and hibernating there. During this long period of hibernation, Atum takes on the identity of Ammon-Ra, and forms the Ogdoad, the primordial gods of ancient Egypt.

Thousands of years later, a group of eight Death Gods from various pantheons combine their mystical might to join all the Hells into one vast dimension. This act forces the reemergence and intervention of the Demogorge, who consumed all but the fleeing Hela. A champion from each pantheon is sent to stop Demogorge and prevent further disaster. Led by Thor, the champions find the God Eater and battle it. Demogorge is defeated by Thor, who plunges into one of its orifices and attacks the God Eater's inner workings. Damaged beyond repair, the entity can no longer contain the energies it has consumed and releases all the previously consumed gods, and restores the Hells to their rightful dimensions.

During the Secret Invasion storyline, the alien Skrulls invade Earth at the behest of their deities, Kly'bn and Sl'gur't. A cadre of gods consisting of Hercules, Snowbird, Amatsu-Mikaboshi and Ajak is formed to combat the Skrull gods, with Atum joining the Earthly pantheon at the request of Horus. He compares himself to a shepherd defending his flock, which he will one day eat. During the confrontation, Atum is killed after trying to devour Sl'gur't, who tears him apart from the inside.

Later, after Thor is slain battling the evil Serpent, his divine soul travels to an afterlife for gods, where he joins many other deities who appear to have died and are all on their way to be devoured by Demogorge; apparently a being such as he can never truly be destroyed. Nevertheless, Thor defeats him by smashing his heart after entering his body, and escapes him once again.

Auran

Aurora

Avalanche

Avoe

Avoe is a fictional deity created by Jonathan Hickman and Dale Eaglesham and first appeared in Fantastic Four #577.

Avoe was the queen and goddess of the Inhuman Dire Wraiths, who had evolved through Exogenesis. Her people made up one fourth of the Universal Inhumans who responded to Earth's moon when searching for Black Bolt, the Midnight King of prophesy. After the return of Black Bolt, Avoe became one of his queens.

During the "Infinity" storyline, where Thanos invaded Earth, which made Black Bolt destroy Attilan, Avoe and the other Universal Inhumans fled Earth to find a new place to live and eventually they established on the planet Centauri-IV, since they were unable to return to their homeworlds.

When the Kree Empire begun ordering all surviving Inhumans to join them or die, the Universal Inhumans arranged a secret meeting to discuss the situation. Before the Inhuman Royal Family arrived, the queens considered to surrender to the Kree, but instead the Kree send their Super-Inhuman soldier, Vox, who killed the queens and their attendants, to send a message to Black Bolt that he wasn't safe.

Awesome Android

Azazel

Azzuri

References 

Ultimate Marvel characters
Marvel Comics characters: A, List of